A weighting pattern for a linear dynamical system describes the relationship between an input  and output . Given the time-variant system described by
 
 ,
then the output can be written as
 ,
where  is the weighting pattern for the system. For such a system, the weighting pattern is  such that  is the state transition matrix.

The weighting pattern will determine a system, but if there exists a realization for this weighting pattern then there exist many that do so.

Linear time invariant system
In a LTI system then the weighting pattern is:
 Continuous
 
where  is the matrix exponential.

 Discrete
 .

References 

Control theory